Phi Sagittarii, Latinized from φ Sagittarii, is a star in the southern constellation of Sagittarius. With an apparent visual magnitude of 3.17, it is the ninth-brightest star in the constellation and is readily visible to the naked eye. It is receding with a radial velocity of +21.5 km/s.

The stellar classification of this star has been rated at B8.5 III, with the luminosity class of III indicating it is a giant star evolved away from the main sequence after it has exhausted the hydrogen at its core.

In the past, this star catalogued as a spectroscopic binary and a companion was apparently detected through lunar occultation. However, it is most likely a solitary star and any nearby stars are merely optical companions.

Name and etymology

In the catalogue of stars in the Calendarium of Al Achsasi al Mouakket, this star was designated Aoul al Sadirah, which was translated into Latin as Prima τού al Sadirah, meaning first returning ostrich.

This star, together with γ Sgr, δ Sgr, ε Sgr, ζ Sgr, λ Sgr, σ Sgr and τ Sgr comprising the Teapot asterism. φ Sgr, σ Sgr, ζ Sgr, χ Sgr and τ Sgr were Al Naʽām al Ṣādirah (النعم السادرة), the Returning Ostriches. According to the catalogue of stars in the Technical Memorandum 33-507 - A Reduced Star Catalog Containing 537 Named Stars, Al Naʽām al Ṣādirah or Namalsadirah was originally the title for four stars: φ Sgr as Namalsadirah I, τ Sgr as Namalsadirah II, χ1 Sgr as Namalsadirah III and χ2 Sgr as Namalsadirah IV (except σ Sgr and ζ Sgr) .

References

B-type giants
B-type subgiants
Sagittarius (constellation)
Sagittarii, Phi
Durchmusterung objects
Sagittarii, 27
173300
092041
7039